In the Mood for Something Rude is the eleventh studio album by British hard rock band Foghat, released in 1982. All eight tracks on the album were penned by outside writers, and the record is something of a covers album in which the band applies its bluesy rock and roll style over a collection of R&B and country tunes.

Track listing
"Slipped, Tripped, Fell in Love" (George Jackson) - 4:18
"Bustin' Up or Bustin' Out" (James Edward Fuller, Leroy Hodges, Jr., Marshall Jones) - 3:43
"Take This Heart of Mine" (Pete Moore, Smokey Robinson, Marv Tarplin) - 3:08
"Love Rustler" (Dennis Linde, Thomas Cain) - 5:48
"Ain't Livin' Long Like This" (Rodney Crowell) - 4:55
"Back for a Taste of Your Love" (Syl Johnson, Darryl Carter, Brenda L. Thompson) - 4:35
"There Ain't No Man That Can't Be Caught" (Jimmy Lewis) - 3:44
"And I Do Just What I Want" (James Brown) - 3:22

Artwork By – Peter Corriston
Backing Vocals – Dave*, Erik*, Nick*
Drums, Percussion – Roger (Havoc) Earl*
Guitar [Rhythm & Lead] – Erik Cartwright
Lead Vocals, Guitar – Dave Peverett
Mastered By – Bob Ludwig
Performer [Mating Sounds] – Barbara Nolan, Maris Hall
Photography By – Chris Callis
Producer, Engineer, Bass, Keyboards, Percussion – Nick Jameson
Producer, Other [Management] – Tony Outeda
Saxophone – Rich Oppenheim

Charts

References

1982 albums
Foghat albums
Bearsville Records albums
Rhino Records albums
Covers albums